Fairforest is a Census-designated place located in Spartanburg County in the U.S. State of South Carolina. According to the 2010 United States Census, the population was 1,646.

History
During the Revolution, Fairforest was one of the only regions in South Carolina where Loyalists outnumbered Patriots.  It was described as a 
"hot-bed of pro-British sentiment." A post office was established as Fair Forest in 1884. According to tradition, a pioneer named the region when, noting the scenery, he said "What a fair forest!"

Geography
Fairforest is located at  (34.946963, -82.018906). The CDP is a suburb of the City of Spartanburg, located to the West of the city, alongside Arcadia and Saxon.

According to the United States Census Bureau, the CDP has a total land area of 5.416 square miles (3.973 km) and a total water area of 0.006  square miles (0.016  km).

Demographics

Education
It is in Spartanburg County School District 6.

References

Census-designated places in Spartanburg County, South Carolina
Census-designated places in South Carolina